Ripon Racecourse is a thoroughbred horse racing venue located in Ripon, North Yorkshire, England and is nicknamed the Garden Racecourse.

History
Racing on the present site on Boroughbridge Road began on 6 August 1900.  but racing has taken place at a number of locations in the city from as far back as 1664 when it hosted its first meeting on Bondgate Green.  An 1856 OS map shows a racecourse on the north side of the Ure beside the road to Thirsk and adjacent to the railway station.

Racing in the town first gained national attention in 1723 when the city hosted Britain's first horse race for female jockeys. Between 1916 and 1919, the southern half of the racecourse was used as a base for No. 76 Squadron of the Royal Flying Corps (later the Royal Air Force) as RFC/RAF Ripon. The ground was also used sporadically for civilian aircraft into the 1920s.

It was voted the 'Best Small Racecourse in the North' by the Racegoers' Club in 2003.

Ripon Racecourse today
The annual race season at Ripon now includes Ripons "Big Night Out" and Family Day in May, Ladies Day in June and the opening day of the Go Racing in Yorkshire in July. There are other fixtures throughout the year including Children's Day, Great St. Wilfrid Day and the Ripon Champion Two-Year-Old Trophy all taking place in August.

Yorkshire Wildlife Trust's Ripon City Wetlands nature reserve is adjacent to the racecourse.

Characteristics

The course is a flat, right-handed oval of 1 mile 5 furlongs with a sharp bend preceding the 5 furlong run in.  There is a chute which creates a six furlong straight course.  The cramped bends and undulations in the straight make the course very sharp.

Facilities

The course has three enclosures - the Club Stand, Paddock Enclosure and Course Enclosure in the centre of the track.  Ripon also boasts a permanent giant screen.

Facts and figures

Number of fixtures (2013) - 16
Top trainer (2007 - 2011 inc.) - Tim Easterby, 33 wins from 340 runs

Notable races

References

External links

Official website
Course guide on GG.COM
Course guide on At The Races
Non-racing Events at Ripon Racecourse

 
Sports venues in North Yorkshire
Horse racing venues in England
Ripon